The following is a list of television programs broadcast by TBS Television. Programs are listed in each section in chronological order.

Current programming

Anime
Ajin: Demi-Human (2016–)

Kids
The Angry Beavers (1997–)
RoboRoach (2002–)
Yoko! Jakamoko! Toto! (2002–)
Christopher Crocodile (1992–)

Dramas
Kazoku no Katachi (2016–)

Game shows
Honoo-no Taiiku-kai TV (2011–)

Other
All-Star Thanksgiving (1991–)
Count Down TV (1993–)

Future programming
Kamiwaza Wanda (2016–)
Kono Bijutsubu ni wa Mondai ga Aru! (2016–)
Girlish Number
IndyCar Series

Former programming

Anime

Otogi Manga Calendar (1962–1964)
8 Man (1963–1964)
Big X (1964–1965)
Obake no Q-tarō (1965–1967)
Kaibutsu-kun (1968–1969)
Kick no Oni (1970–1971)
Marvelous Melmo (1971–1972)
Dokonjō Gaeru (1972–1974)
Kōya no Shōnen Isamu (1973–1974)
Chargeman Ken! (1974)
First Human Giatrus (1974–1976)
Hoshi no Ko Chobin (1974)
Kum-Kum (1975–1976)
UFO Warrior Dai Apolon (1976–1977)
The Ultraman (1979–1980)
Wonder Beat Scramble (1986)
Lady Lady!! (1987–1988)
The Laughing Salesman (1989–1992)
Dragon Quest: Dai no Daibōken (1991–1992)
Tonde Burin (1994–1995)
Yamato Takeru (1994)
Mama Loves the Poyopoyo-Saurus (1995–1996)
B't X (1996)
You're Under Arrest (1996–1997)
Anime Ganbare Goemon (1997–1998)
B't X Neo (1997)
Yoiko (1998–1999)
Blue Gender (1999–2000)
Di Gi Charat (1999)
Iketeru Futari (1999)
Monster Rancher (1999–2001)
Pet Shop of Horrors (1999)
Power Stone (1999)
You're Under Arrest (1999)
Di Gi Charat - Christmas Special (2000)
Di Gi Charat - Summer Special 2000 (2000)
Miami Guns (2000)
Di Gi Charat - Natsuyasumi Special (2001)
Di Gi Charat - Ohamami Special (2001)
Di Gi Charat - Tsuyu Special (2001)
Go! Go! Itsutsugo Land (2001–2002)
Rave Master (2001–2002)
You're Under Arrest (2001)
Chobits (2002)
GetBackers (2002–2003)
Heat Guy J (2002–2003)
Mobile Suit Gundam SEED (2002–2003)
Detective School Q (2003–2004)
Fullmetal Alchemist (2003–2004)
Melody of Oblivion (2004)
This Ugly Yet Beautiful World (2004)
Zipang (2004)
Ah! My Goddess (2005–2006)
Black Cat (2005–2006)
Blood+ (2005–2006)
009-1 (2006)
Ah! My Goddess: Flights of Fancy (2006)
Binchō-tan (2006)
Winter Garden (2006)
Kanon (2006–2007)
Living for the Day After Tomorrow (2006)
Rec (2006)
Darker than Black (2007)
Love Com (2007)
Oh! Edo Rocket (2007)
Ōkiku Furikabutte (2007)
Princess Resurrection (2007)
Romeo × Juliet (2007)
Venus Versus Virus (2007)
You're Under Arrest: Full Throttle (2007–2008)
Itazura na Kiss (2008)
To Love-Ru (2008)
Darker than Black: Gemini of the Meteor (2009)
Fullmetal Alchemist: Brotherhood (2009–2010)
K-On! (2009)
Kämpfer (2009)
Pandora Hearts (2009)
Umi Monogatari (2009)
Amagami SS (2010)
And Yet the Town Moves (2010)
K-On!! (2010)
Maid Sama! (2010)
Ōkami Kakushi (2010)
Ōkiku Furikabutte ~Natsu no Taikai-hen~ (2010)
A Channel (2011)
Dororon Enma-kun Meeramera (2011)
Dream Eater Merry (2011)
Haganai (2011)
The Idolmaster (2011)
Infinite Stratos (2011)
Kämpfer für die Liebe (2011)
Mobile Suit Gundam AGE (2011–2012)
Puella Magi Madoka Magica (2011)
Amagami SS+ plus (2012)
Blast of Tempest (2012–2013)
Busou Shinki (2012)Eureka Seven: AO (2012)K (2012)Kill Me Baby (2012)Nakaimo - My Sister Is Among Them! (2012)Natsuiro Kiseki (2012)Place to Place (2012)Devil Survivor 2: The Animation (2013)Haganai NEXT (2013)Infinite Stratos 2 (2013)Kill la Kill (2013–2014)My Teen Romantic Comedy SNAFU (2013)Outbreak Company (2013)Photo Kano (2013)Vividred Operation (2013)Gundam Reconguista in G (2014–2015)Knights of Sidonia (2014)Locodol (2014)Magical Warfare (2014)Rail Wars! (2014)Riddle Story of Devil (2014)The Heroic Legend of Arslan (2015)K: Return of Kings (2015)Knights of Sidonia: War of the Ninth Planet (2015)My Teen Romantic Comedy SNAFU TOO! (2015)Re-Kan! (2015)Unlimited Fafnir (2015)

DramasKey Hunter (1968–1973)Nantatte 18 sai! (1971–1972)Akai Meiro (1974–1975)Kinpachi-sensei (1979–2011)Aoi Zesshō (1980–1981)Miracle Girl (1980–1982)Omoide Zukuri (1981)Natsu ni Koisuru Onnatachi (1983)Mujaki na Kankei (1984)Ponytail wa Furimukanai (1985–1986)Uchi no Ko ni Kagitte... (1985–1986)Tsūkai! OL Dōri (1986)Wataru Seken wa Oni Bakari (1990)Oka no Ue no Himawari (1993)Aishiteiru to Itte Kure (1995)Keizoku (1999)Majo no Jōken (1999)Salaryman Kintarō (1999–2004)Beautiful Life (2000)Strawberry on the Shortcake (2001)Kisarazu Cat's Eye (2002)Good Luck!! (2003)Stand Up! (2003)Tramps Like Us (2003)Orange Days (2004)Socrates in Love (2004)Aikurushii (2005)H2: Kimi to Ita Hibi (2005)Hana Yori Dango (2005)Dragon Zakura (2005)Bengoshi no Kuzu (2006)Dare Yorimo Mama o Ai su (2006)Journey Under the Midnight Sun (2006)Sailor Suit and Machine Gun (2006)Hana Yori Dango Returns (2007)Karei-naru Ichizoku (2007)Yamada Tarō Monogatari (2007)Bloody Monday (2008)Maō (2008)Ryokiteki na Kanojo (2008)Ryūsei no Kizuna (2008)Drifting Net Cafe (2009)Jin (2009–2011)Love Shuffle (2009)Orthros no Inu (2009)Smile (2009)Flunk Punk Rumble (2010)Shinzanmono (2010)The Wallflower (2010)Heaven's Flower The Legend of Arcana (2011)Ikemen desu ne (2011)Kaitō Royale (2011)Nankyoku Tairiku (2011)Ouran High School Host Club (2011)Watashi wa Shadow (2011)Ataru (2012)Hana no Zubora-Meshi (2012)Monsters (2012)Ōoku: The Inner Chambers (2012)Perfect Blue (2012)Renai Neet: Wasureta Koi no Hajimekata (2012)Resident – 5-nin no Kenshui (2012)Andō Lloyd: A.I. knows Love? (2013)Hanzawa Naoki (2013)Higanjima (Island of the Equinox) (2013)Pin to Kona (2013)Mozu (2014)The Emperor's Cook (2015)Ouroboros (2015)Yamegoku: Yakuza Yamete Itadakimasu (2015)

FilmsDark Tales of Japan (2004)Nemuri no Mori (2014)

JidaigekiMito Kōmon (1969–2011)Ōoka Echizen (1970–1999)Edo o Kiru (1973–1994)

TokusatsuUltra Q (1966)Captain Ultra (1967)Ultra Seven (1967–1968)Ultra Fight (1970–1971)The Return of Ultraman (1971–1972)Iron King (1972–1973)Ultraman Ace (1972–1973)Ultraman Taro (1973–1974)Ultraman Leo (1974–1975)Kamen Rider Stronger (1975)Ultraman 80 (1980–1981)Ultraman Tiga (1996–1997)Ultraman Gaia (1998–1999)

Variety showsKato-chan Ken-chan Gokigen TV (1986–1992)Utaban (1996–2010)Koko ga Hen da yo Nihonjin (1998–2002)Koisuru Hanikami (2003–2009)Lincoln (2005–2013)

OtherSesame Street (1970-2016)
Takeshi's Castle''' (1986–1990)The Puzzle Place (1996-2000)

See also
List of anime aired on TBS, an alphabetical list of all anime broadcast by TBS

References

Tokyo Broadcasting System